"Numb" is a single by the male/female British music group Honey Ryder. It was released in the United Kingdom on 28 July 2008 as the first single from their first studio album Rising Up. The song peaked at number 32 on the UK Singles Chart.

Music video
A music video to accompany "Numb" was released onto YouTube on 25 March 2008 at a total length of four minutes and four seconds.

Track listing
Digital download
 "Numb" - 4:07

Chart performance

Release history

References

2008 singles
Honey Ryder (band) songs
2008 songs